Edward J. Roitz (born March 18, 1955) is an American politician who served in the Kansas State Senate as a Republican from 1981 to 1984.

Roitz owned and operated a number of convenience stores and gas stations that were controlled by his family business. He was originally elected to the State Senate in 1980 and served for one term; he left office after the 1984 legislative session and was replaced by Democrat Phillip W. Martin. In addition to his time in the Kansas Senate, Roitz served as mayor and city councillor.

In 2022, he attempted a return to the state legislature, running for the Kansas House of Representatives in District 16. He faced no opposition in the primary, but was defeated in the general election by incumbent Democrat Linda Featherston.

External Links
 Roitz's papers from his time in the State Senate

References

Republican Party Kansas state senators
Kansas Republicans
20th-century American politicians
21st-century American politicians
People from Pittsburg, Kansas
Politicians from Overland Park, Kansas
Mayors of places in Kansas
Kansas city council members
1955 births
Living people